= HNLMS Van Bochove =

Royal Netherlands Navy ship

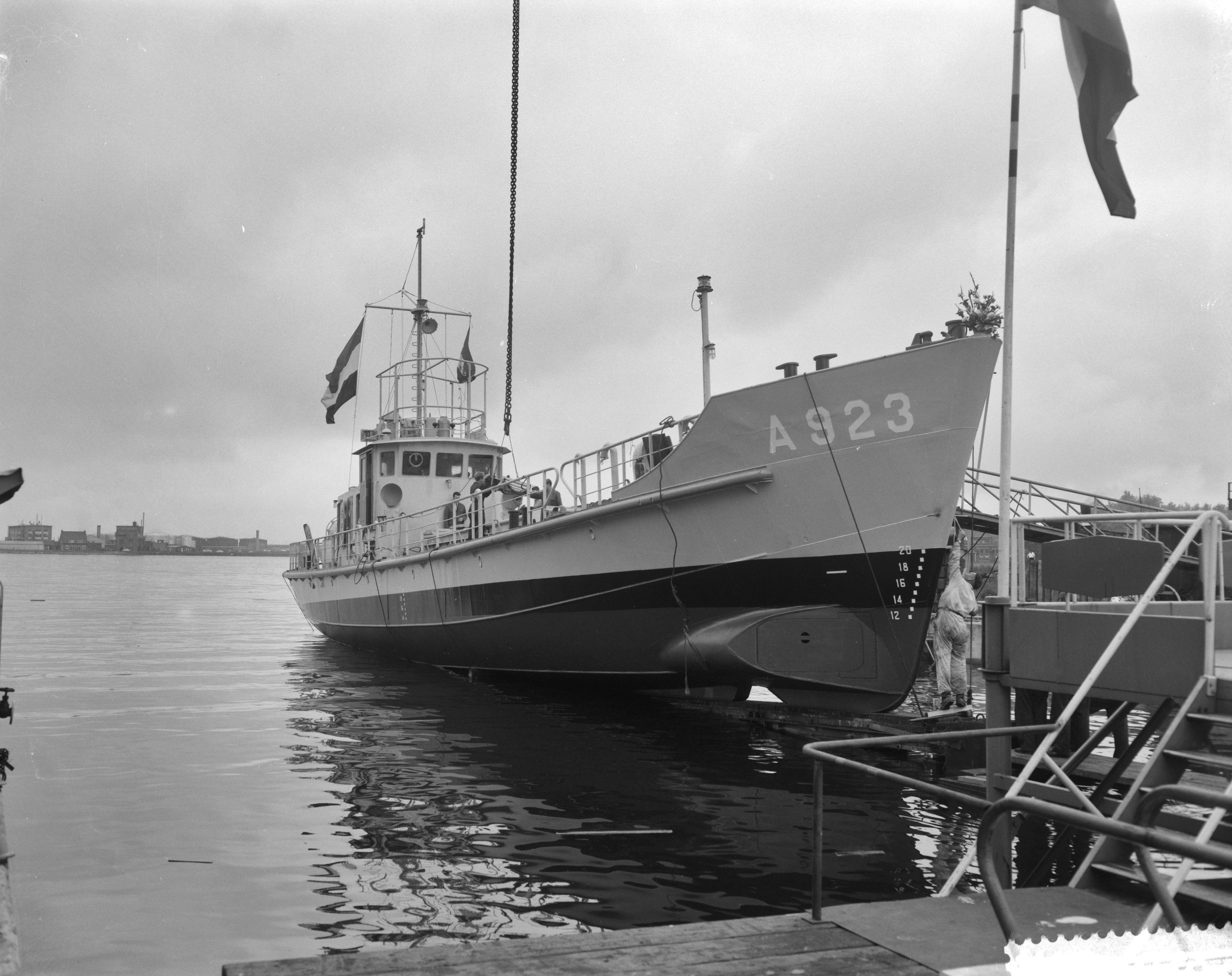
- Van Bochove

History

Netherlands
- Name: Van Bochove
- Namesake: P.D. van Bochove
- Operator: Royal Netherlands Navy
- Builder: N.V. Zaanlandse Scheepsbouwmaatschappij, Zaandam
- Laid down: 9 April 1962
- Launched: 20 July 1962
- Commissioned: 3 August 1962
- Decommissioned: 12 February 1987
- Identification: A 923

General characteristics
- Type: Auxiliary ship
- Displacement: 137.5 t (135.3 long tons)
- Length: 29.79 m (97 ft 9 in)
- Beam: 5.53 m (18 ft 2 in)
- Draught: 1.82 m (6 ft 0 in)
- Propulsion: 1 propeller; 140 hp (100 kW); 1 x Kromhout diesel engine
- Speed: 8 knots (15 km/h; 9.2 mph)
- Crew: 8
- Armament: 2 x Torpedo tubes

HNLMS Van Bochove (A923) was a ship (Note: In Dutch the ship was classified as Torpedoinschietvaartuig.) of the Royal Netherlands Navy that was used to test torpedoes. After the removal of its torpedo tubes the ship served for a while as a communication ship.

== Design and construction ==
Van Bochove was built at the shipyard of N.V. Zaanlandse Scheepsbouwmaatschappij in Zaandam. The ship was laid down on 9 April 1962, launched on 20 July 1962 and commissioned into the Royal Netherlands Navy (RNN) on 3 August 1962. It was named after Lieutenant ter zee der 1ste klasse P.D. van Bochove, who died in an accident in 1959 during a torpedo test exercise.

The ship was specially designed to test torpedoes and was for this purpose equipped with two torpedo tubes. Previously, the RNN used older submarines to test torpedoes, but since the RNN lacked at the time enough submarines it was decided to build a special ship for this purpose.

== Service history ==
Van Bochove was taken out of service on 18 December 1986 and decommissioned on 12 February 1987.
